Mymensingh Division is one of the eight administrative divisions of Bangladesh. It was formed in 2015 from districts previously composing the northern part of Dhaka Division. Its headquarters are in Mymensingh city in Mymensingh District.

History 

The Greater Mymensingh region (Mymensingh District along with five other neighbouring districts) was created as a Mymensingh district by the British Indian government in 1787. Later it was reorganized in two phases into six districts: Mymensingh, Kishoreganj, Netrakona, Jamalpur, Tangail, and Sherpur. But Kishoreganj and Tangail are no longer part of Mymensingh, so Mymensingh comprises four districts.

On 12 January 2015 prime minister Sheikh Hasina declared the establishment of a new Mymensingh Division. The initial intention was to carve six districts (those comprising the original Mymensingh district of 1787) out of the Dhaka Division. However, while four of the districts were eager for the establishment of a new division, people in the Tangail and Kishoreganj Districts wished to remain part of Dhaka Division. On 14 September 2015 Mymensingh was officially announced as a division consisting of four districts.

Administrative divisions

Census figures for 1991, 2001 and 2011 are from Bangladesh Bureau of Statistics, Population Census Wing.

Muslims are the predominant religion with 95.19%, while Hindus and Christians are 4.22% and 0.51% of the population respectively. Mymensingh has the highest percentage of Muslims of all divisions of Bangladesh.

References

 
Divisions of Bangladesh
Eastern Bengal